Life of Ryan was an American reality television series on MTV. The series debuted on August 27, 2007 with the second season premiering on January 8, 2008 and the 3rd and final season airing on April 18, 2009 The series follows the day-to-day life of professional skateboarder Ryan Sheckler as he manages his personal life and his career. Most episodes take place at Sheckler's home in San Clemente, California. His friends, along with fellow professional skateboarders, make various appearances in the series. The show aired for 3 seasons total.

Episodes

Season 1

Season 2

Production and broadcast
The show was produced by Carbone Entertainment and Good Clean Fun for MTV and can be seen on MTV Arabia, MTV, MTV2, MTV Australia, MTV Europe. MTV Poland, MTV Adria, MTV Hungary, MTV Romania, MTV Portugal, MTV Central, MTV Canada, MTV Italia, MTV New Zealand, MTV UK, MTV Turkey and MTV Latin America. Life of Ryan debuted on Monday, August 27, 2007, at 10:30pm following The Hills.

Cast

Main cast
 Ryan Sheckler, Professional Skateboarder
 Shane Sheckler, Ryan's 14-year-old brother
 Kane Sheckler, Ryan's 7-year-old brother
 Gretchen Sheckler, Ryan's mother/manager
 Randall 'Randy' Sheckler, Ryan's father

Supporting cast
 Steve Astephen, Ryan’s agent
 Casey Feitler, Ryan’s friend
 Tony Panici, Ryan’s friend
 Taylor Bogart, Ryan’s friend 
 Mitch Bohi, Ryan’s friend
 Whitney Adams, Ryan’s friend

Recurring Cast
 Christi, Randy Sheckler’s girlfriend 
 Bruce, Gretchen Sheckler’s boyfriend
 Kayla Kudla, Ryan’s girlfriend

Guest Appearances
 Jereme Rogers, Pro Skateboarder
 Paul Rodriguez, Pro Skateboarder
 Greg Lutzka, Pro Skateboarder
 Bob Burnquist, Pro Skateboarder 
 Tony Hawk, Pro Skateboarder
 Carey Hart, Pro Motocross Rider
 Steve Nash, Pro Basketball Player
 Ryan Seacrest, Radio Presenter
 Lil’ Jon, Rapper
 Verne Troyer, Actor
 Melissa Mikkelsen, Model
 Roland Trettl, Chef

DVD release
Life of Ryan: The Complete Series was released on DVD on April 21, 2009. Special features include 3 skate featurettes.

References

External links
Official MTV site
Ryan Sheckler's official site 
Ryan Sheckler at MySpace

MTV reality television series
Skateboarding mass media
2000s American reality television series
2007 American television series debuts
2008 American television series endings
Television shows set in California
Television series by Good Clean Fun (production company)